Maruja Pibernat (died 2004) was a film and radio actress.

Biography

Maruja Pibernat was born in Spain and died in Buenos Aires on July 3, 2004. She was a film and radio actress, who began her career with sound films in the 1930s and finished in the 1980s cinema.

Works

 Riachuelo by director Luis Moglia Barth in 1934.
 The Hour of Mary and the Bird of Gold by director Rodolfo Kuhn in 1975.
 Night of the Pencils by director Héctor Olivera in 1986.
 The Year of The Rabbit by director Fernando Ayala in 1987.

References

 Blancos Pazos, Roberto (1997). Un diccionario de actrices del cine argentino (1933-1997) Buenos Aires, Editorial Corregidor. .
 Manrupe, Raúl; Portela, María Alejandra (2001). Un diccionario de films argentinos (1930-1995) Buenos Aires, Editorial Corregidor. .

External links
  Maruja Pibernat en el sitio del cine nacional 

Year of birth missing
2004 deaths
Argentine film actresses
People from Buenos Aires